One Moment More is the debut album by American singer-songwriter Mindy Smith.

In 2003, she was invited by producer Steve Buckingham to record a cover version of "Jolene" for the tribute album Just Because I'm a Woman: Songs of Dolly Parton. That song drew attention to Smith, a native of Long Island, New York, who had moved to Nashville. She signed with the jazz label Vanguard Records and released her debut album in 2004. It was produced by Buckingham, who is a member of the Country Music Hall of Fame. During the same year, Smith won the award for Emerging Artist of the Year from the Americana Music Association.

The song "Come to Jesus" reached the Billboard charts. The Gaither Vocal Band recorded a cover version that won Bluegrass Song of the Year at the Dove Awards in 2012. Ten years after her recording, Smith said, "I believe God breathed it through me, and I was able to put it to paper." One Moment More is named after a song on the album that addresses the death of her mother. Similarly, the rest of the album deals with loss, struggle, and renewal.

Track listing

Personnel

 Mindy Smith – vocals
 Steve Buckingham – dulcimer, acoustic guitar, electric guitar, Hammond organ
 Dan Dugmore – steel guitar, lap steel guitar
 Will Kimbrough – electric guitar
 Sonny Landreth – slide guitar
 Bryan Sutton – acoustic guitar, guitar
 Kenny Vaughan – electric guitar
 David Jacques – bass guitar
 Viktor Krauss – bass
 Glenn Worf – bass
 Lex Price – mandolin
 Chris Carmichael – violin, cello, viola
 David Angell – violin
 Pamela Sixfin – violin
 Kathryn Vanosdale – violin
 Connie Ellisor – violin
 Kristin Wilkinson – viola
 Jim Grosjean – viola
 Matt Rollings – Hammond organ
 Steve Conn – Hammond organ, accordion
 John Deaderick – piano, keyboard
 Shannon Forrest – drums
 Paul Griffith – drums, percussion
 Dolly Parton – harmony vocals
 Daniel Tashian – harmony vocals

Production
 Producers: Steve Buckingham, Mindy Smith
 Engineers: Scott Baggett, Neal Cappellino, Paul Hart, Marshall Morgan, Gary Paczosa, Bart Pursley
 Assistant engineers: Paul Hart, Thomas Johnson
 Mixing: Gary Paczosa
 Mastering: Robert Hadley, Doug Sax
 String arrangements: Kristin Wilkinson

Charts
Album - Billboard 

Singles - Billboard
 2004 – "Come to Jesus", 35, Adult Top 40

References

Mindy Smith albums
2004 debut albums
Vanguard Records albums